The obusier de vaisseau was a light piece of naval artillery with a large calibre mounted on French warships of the Age of Sail. Designed to fire explosive shells at a low velocity, they were an answer to the carronade in the close combat and anti-personnel role. However, their intended ammunition proved too dangerous for the crew, and the French navy phased them out at the beginning of the Empire in favour of the carronade.

Accounts by British warships of the armament of captured French ships tend to describe them as carronades. However, when the description includes the remark that the weapon was brass, this suggests that it was an obusier.

Several of the guns were recovered from the wreck of the Golymin in the road of Brest, and are now on display at the Musée national de la Marine in Paris and in Brest.

Citations and references 
Citations

References
 Jean Boudriot et Hubert Berti, L'Artillerie de mer : marine française 1650-1850, Paris, éditions Ancre, 1992 (notice BNF no FRBNF355550752). 
 Jean Peter, L'artillerie et les fonderies de la marine sous Louis XIV, Paris, Economica, 1995, 213 p.. 
 Napoléon et l’évolution de l’artillerie des vaisseaux, Nicolas Mioque

External links 
 

Naval guns of France